More to Love is a reality game show (or dating game show) that premiered on Fox on July 28, 2009. The series was hosted by plus-sized model Emme.  The show was created by Mike Fleiss (who also created The Bachelor).

About the show
The series followed Luke Conley of Santa Maria, California, a single plus size man (age: 26, height: 6' 3", weight: 330 lbs)  trying to find love among twenty plus size women. The first episode featured Luke giving a promise ring to each of the 20 ladies, with the promise he would not judge them by their size.

Contestants

References

External links
 
 
 

American dating and relationship reality television series
2000s American reality television series
2009 American television series debuts
2009 American television series endings
2000s American game shows
Fox Broadcasting Company original programming
Television series by Warner Horizon Television
Television shows set in California